Brave New World is the third studio album by American rock band Steve Miller Band, released in 1969. It is the band's first album following the departure of founding members Boz Scaggs and Jim Peterman, with Ben Sidran replacing Peterman on keyboards.  The album 
reached number 22 on the Billboard 200 album chart.  In Colin Larkin's third edition of All Time Top 1000 Albums (2000) it was voted number 676.

Paul McCartney contributed to  "My Dark Hour" (credited as "Paul Ramon"), providing backing vocals, drums, guitar and bass guitar.

Track listing

References

External links

Steve Miller Band albums
1969 albums
Albums produced by Glyn Johns
Capitol Records albums